Jean Duarte (born 20 August 1965) is a French boxer. He competed in the men's light welterweight event at the 1984 Summer Olympics.

References

1965 births
Living people
French male boxers
Olympic boxers of France
Boxers at the 1984 Summer Olympics
Place of birth missing (living people)
Light-welterweight boxers